Penzance railway station serves the town of Penzance in west Cornwall, England. It is the terminus of the Cornish Main Line from Plymouth,  from  via , and is the southernmost railway station in Great Britain. The first station opened in 1852 and through travel to and from London commenced from 1859 with the opening of the Royal Albert Bridge. The station was rebuilt by the Great Western Railway in 1876 and the current layout was the result of a further rebuilding in the 1930s. As of 2023, the station is owned by Network Rail and managed by Great Western Railway who also operate train services there, together with CrossCountry.

History

Broad gauge era
The station was opened by the West Cornwall Railway on 11 March 1852  as the terminus of its line from Redruth. The station itself consisted of a single platform face, and along with the rest of the West Cornwall Railway was laid as standard gauge. This changed in 1866 when the West Cornwall Railway was relaid to mixed gauge allowing South Devon Railway Leopard class locomotive Lance to bring in the first broad gauge train which carried dignitaries from Truro, although the small station with the single platform remained with little other alteration. A siding extended beyond the goods shed and ran along Albert Quay.

In 1876 the Great Western Railway took over the West Cornwall Railway and a major redevelopment was undertaken. An enlarged goods shed was built and the wooden passenger buildings were replaced by a much larger station  built in rock-faced granite to a design by William Lancaster Owen. The total cost was around £15,000 which included the 250ft by 80ft roof which cost £5,000 for the iron and the 50 tons of glass. The new station had the booking office  at street level with the two platforms were accessed by a staircase, and was used for the first time on 18 November 1879. However, the new station suffered from teething problems, as by 1880 it was reported that some settlement in the masonry and shrinkage of the iron in the roof had caused several sheets of the glazing to break.

In 1892, station was converted from broad gauge to standard gauge. At the same time, work was undertaken to widen and extend both the two platforms, and a fourth road was laid in the station.

After 1892 

Following grouping, about 60 staff were employed at Penzance station by the 1930s. In 1937 the GWR were granted permission to reclaim land from the sea, permitting a significant enlargement of the station with the capacity being doubled with two platforms providing four platform faces, three of which were under the main roof.

The blocked-up archway in the wall that retains the hillside behind the platforms was used by the railway as a coal store.

The last train of the steam era to Penzance was a railtour hauled by West Country class 34002 Salisbury on 3 May 1964.

The WCR station had a disc-and-crossbar signal on the end of the single platform, this being common on the GWR and associated companies. This was replaced by the familiar semaphore signals, and these were replaced in turn by colour light signals in 1982.

Further alterations were made in 1983 when a new ticket office and buffet were opened. The 1983 refurbishment also included the replacement of the lantern roof with a different design.  The new roof failed to vent diesel fumes from the trains to the necessary safety standard, meaning passengers had to alight outside the concourse.

This ceased in December 2009.

In 2012–13 the station's roof was refurbished.

On May 7th, 2017, Geoff Marshall and Vicki Pipe started their journey to visit every station on the National Rail network over a fourteen-week period at this station, to create their documentary series “All the Stations”.

Station Masters

James D. Christian ???? - 1865
John Greenwood Bone 1865 - 1882 
G. Bain 1882 - 1886 (formerly station master at )
William Blair 1887 - 1911 (formerly station master at Wootton Bassett)
H. Morris 1912 - 1916 (formerly station master at )
James Tierney 1916 - 1920
H.C. Foster 1921 - 1924 (formerly station master at Paignton, afterwards station master at )
Harry T. Giles 1924 - 1931 (formerly station master at Acton)
Herbert Edgar Tucker 1931 - 1940 (formerly station master at Kingsbridge)
Henry Gordon Lyon 1940 - 1949 (afterwards station master at )

Platform layout

Platforms 1, 2 and 3 are within the main train shed; Platform 4 on the south side is in the open air. A large stone at the end of this platform welcomes people to Penzance in both English and Cornish. This side of the station is built on the sea wall near the harbour; the other side is cut into the hillside. 

Facilities 
As the western terminus of the Night Riviera service from London Paddington, the station has a sleeper lounge and a shower room to the northern end of the concourse, as well as waiting rooms and two cafes in the concourse. There is also an information point on platform 3.

Services

Penzance is the terminus of the Cornish Main Line. London services include the Night Riviera overnight sleeping car service and the Golden Hind which offers an early morning service to London Paddington and an evening return. Other fast trains are the mid-morning Cornish Riviera and the afternoon Royal Duchy.

Penzance is the terminus of the longest train service in the United Kingdom, which runs from  takes about 13 and a half hours.

This ceased in December 2009.

Freight and mail 
The WCR station had both a goods shed and a locomotive shed between the passenger station and the sea, and when a fire destroyed the goods shed in 1876 the building was enlarged considerably incorporating the original locomotive shed which had been replaced by one on the opposite side of the line near the end of the retaining wall, which in turn was replaced by the new Penzance Traction Maintenance Depot outside the station at Long Rock. In the first decade of the 20th century Penzance was typically handling 45,000 tons of goods each year.

In November 1882 there were complaints about the paving, rail tracks and the difficulty for traffic to pass on the Albert Pier. The Borough Council requested the Railway Company to replace the paving with granite setts before relaying the rails.

When the expansion of 1937 doubled the number of platform faces, the fourth face was outside the overall roof, and this was used for mail and parcels traffic as access to the road was provided.

In 1987 the goods facilities were removed and the land levelled for use as a car park.

Passenger volume
Penzance is the second busiest station in Cornwall,  being the busiest with more than twice the number of passengers compared with Penzance.  Comparing the year from April 2011 to that which started in April 2002, passenger numbers increased by 48%.

The statistics cover twelve month periods that start in April.

Notes

References

Citations

References

External links

Video footage and history of Penzance railway station

Further reading
 

Former Great Western Railway stations
Railway stations in Cornwall
Railway stations in Great Britain opened in 1852
Railway stations served by CrossCountry
Railway stations served by Great Western Railway
Railway stations serving harbours and ports in the United Kingdom
William Lancaster Owen railway stations
1852 establishments in England
Buildings and structures in Penzance
DfT Category C1 stations
Cardinal points of the Great British railway network